was a prominent Japanese shamisen player and rōkyoku singer.

In addition to performing and recording traditional music, he was also the only prominent shamisen player to perform and record bluegrass music; he spent some time in the 2000s in the bluegrass program of East Tennessee State University in Johnson City, Tennessee. He also performed and recorded in a rock music-influenced style.

At the age of 14 Kunimoto attended a Bill Monroe concert in Tokyo and shook his hand, thus inspiring Takeharu to play bluegrass.

Kunimoto died at the age of 55 on December 24, 2015, following an illness.

Discography
Contributing artist
 The Rough Guide to the Music of Japan (1999, World Music Network)
 The Last Frontier: Appalachian Shamisen (2005, Now and Then Records)

References

External links
Takeharu Kunimoto page
Takeharu Kunimoto biography from Last Frontier site
Takeharu Kunimoto page
J-Pop World interview

Video
Music video for "Tai Tai Zukushi"

Japanese bluegrass musicians
1960 births
2015 deaths
East Tennessee State University alumni
Shamisen players
Musicians from Chiba Prefecture